The Solonț is a right tributary of the river Tazlău in Romania. It discharges into the Tazlău in Tărâța.

References

Rivers of Romania
Rivers of Bacău County